Medzianky is a village and municipality in Vranov nad Topľou District in the Prešov Region of eastern Slovakia.

History
In historical records the village was first mentioned in 1212.

Geography
The municipality lies at an altitude of 240 metres and covers an area of 4.930 km². It has a population of about 315 people.

External links
 
 
https://web.archive.org/web/20080208225314/http://www.statistics.sk/mosmis/eng/run.html 

Villages and municipalities in Vranov nad Topľou District